Vasily Rabota (ru)
 Aleksandr Raevsky
 Dmitry Razumovsky (ru)
 Aleksey Rasskaza (ru)
 Vasily Rastyapin (ru)
 Mansur Rafikov (ru)
 Vladimir Rakhmanov (ru)
 Sergey Radchuk (ru)
 Mikhail Revenko (ru)
 Sergey Revin
 Viktor Ren (ru)
 Grigory Reutov (ru)
 Igor Rzhavitin (ru)
 Aleksey Rodin (ru)
 Yevgeny Rodionov (ru)
 Igor Rodobolsky (ru)
 Yevgeny Rodkin (ru)
 Andrey Rozhkov (ru)
 Roman Romanenko
 Aleksey Romanov (ru)
 Anatoly Romanov
 Viktor Romanov (ru)
 Viktor Romanov (ru)
 Sergey Romashin (ru)
 Sergey Ropotan (ru)
 Nikolai Rostovsky (ru)
 Valery Rostovshchikov (ru)
 Ivan Rubtsov (ru)
 Sergey Rudskoy (ru)
 Aleksandr Rudykh (ru)
 Aleksey Rumyantsev (ru)
 Aleksey Rusanov (ru)
 Leonid Russkikh (ru)
 Vladimir Rushailo
 Aleksey Rybak (ru)
 Sergey Rybnikov (ru)
 Aleksandr Ryzhikov (ru)
 Sergey Ryzhikov
 Pyotr Ryzhov (ru)
 Anatoly Rymar (ru)
 Yevgeny Ryndin (ru)
 Dmitry Rychkov (ru)
 Sergey Ryazansky
 Aleksandr Ryazantsev (ru)

References 
 

Heroes R